Nigel David Hall (born September 15, 1981) is an American vocalist and keyboardist. He is a current member of Lettuce and also fronts his solo project, The Nigel Hall Band.

Born and raised in Washington, D.C. and currently residing in New Orleans, Louisiana.  Lettuce's keyboardist/vocalist Nigel Hall is an accomplished musician steeped in gospel music tradition, as well as classic soul, funk, hip hop and R&B. Hall was discovered by Lettuce co-founder Ryan Zoidis around 2007, who invited him to Brooklyn to meet Eric Krasno and record with jazz band Soulive. Nigel was a fan of Soulive and this was a major moment for his young career. At that same time Hall connected with Lettuce drummer Adam Deitch and The Roots drummer/founder Ahmir Questlove Thompson, and soon began appearing onstage with Soulive, Lettuce, and Royal Family affiliates. Hall was first nominated for a Grammy Award for his work on Ledesi's 2009 album, Turn Me Loose. In 2011, Hall moved to New Orleans to immerse himself in the Crescent City's musical heritage. It was there where Hall was drafted by Jon Cleary for his band, and appeared on the pianist's Grammy-winning album, Go-Go Juice. Hall toured with Robert Randolph and the Family Band, John Scofield, and briefly with Tedeschi-Trucks Band, before he was chosen as a keyboardist/vocalist for Warren Haynes Band.

Hall appears on Warren Haynes Band's studio album, Man in Motion and live album, Live at the Moody Theater, released on Stax Records. Hall appears on the Grammy nominated Family Dinner Vol. 1 from Snarky Puppy, as well as Grammy-nominated album from Cha Wa. Hall has also appeared onstage with Marcus King, Pretty Lights, Dave Matthews Band, and more. In 2012, Hall co-founded The Nth Power, a funk/soul/R&B band with former Beyonce drummer Nikki Glaspie. In 2015, Hall departed The Nth Power and soon released Nigel Hall Band's debut, Ladies & Gentleman... A Bonnaroo 2013 performance saw Hall share the stage with Chaka Khan, Willie Weeks, James Gadsden, Derek Trucks, Susan Tedeschi, Solange, members of the Wu-Tang Clan, Anthony Hamilton, SchoolBoy Q, DJ Jazzy Jeff, Chance the Rapper, and Thundercat. As a solo artist, Hall has been nominated for the New Orleans Offbeat awards, won New Orleans Big Easy Award, and has been a featured solo artist at New Orleans Jazz & Heritage Festival for five consecutive years. Hall performed at New Orleans’ Essence Music Festival for the first time in July 2019.  Hall joined Lettuce as a full-time keyboardist and vocalist in 2015. Hall is featured on Lettuce's fifth album, Elevate, in June 2019.

Nigel Hall Band
The Nigel Hall Band's debut record, Ladies & Gentlemen... Nigel Hall, was released on Feel Music / Round Hill Records in November 2015. A commercial and critical success, Ladies & Gentlemen... allowed Hall to tour extensively for the first time as a solo act. Derwin "Big D" Perkins (guitar), Eric Vogel (bass) and Jamison Ross (drums) are frequent members of the Nigel Hall Band.

Discography
Ladies & Gentlemen... Nigel Hall
Released November 13, 2015 on Feel Music

 "Gimme A Sign"
 "Don't Change For Me"
 "Too Sweet"
 "Never Gonna Let You Go"
 "Try"
 "Lay Away"
 "Let's Straighten It Out"
 "I Just Wanna Love You"
 "I Can't Stand the Rain"
 "Call On Me"
 "Hang It Up" (Bonus Track)
 "Leave Me Alone" (Bonus Track)
 "Baby I Do Love You" (Bonus Track)

References

1981 births
Living people
American rhythm and blues singers
American funk singers
American soul singers
21st-century American keyboardists
Songwriters from Washington, D.C.